Jonas Davidsson (born 7 August 1984 in Motala, Sweden) is a former motorcycle speedway rider from Sweden and he was a member of Swedish national team.

Career
Davidsson came to prominence after reaching three World Under 21 finals in 2003, 2004 and 2005. He also won the Swedish Junior Speedway Championship in 2005.

He signed for his first British team Reading Racers for the 2003 Premier League speedway season and his first Polish team Zielona Góra in 2006.

In 2008, Davidsson experienced arguably his fineest career achievement when he won a bronze medal representing Sweden at the 2008 Speedway World Cup. It was also in 2008 that he joined the Lakeside Hammers in the Elite League. He would go on spend five seasons with the club and win the Elite League Knockout Cup in 2009.

He continued to ride in Poland after his British career came to an end and last raced in 2019 for Krosno.

Family
And his brother, Daniel Davidsson (b. 1983), is also a speedway rider, as was his father Jan Davidsson (born 1956).

Speedway Grand Prix results

Career details

World Championships 

 Individual U-21 World Championship (Under-21 World Championship)
 2003 -  Slaný - 9th place (6 points)
 2004 -  Wrocław - 12th place (6 points)
 2005 -  Wiener Neustadt - 11th place (3 points)
 Team World Championship (Speedway World Cup)
 2007 -  Leszno - 5th place (9 points in Race-Off)
 2008 -  Vojens - Bronze medal (10 points)
 Team U-21 World Championship (Under-21 Speedway World Cup)
 2005 -  Pardubice - Runner-up (7 points)

European Championships 

 Individual U-19 European Championship
 2000 -  Ljubljana - 6th place (8 points)
 2002 -  Daugavpils - 6th place (9 points)

Others 

 Mieczysław Połukard Criterium of Polish Speedway Leagues Aces -  Bydgoszcz
 2008 - 8th place (8 points)

See also 
Swedish national speedway team
List of Speedway Grand Prix riders

References

Swedish speedway riders
1984 births
Living people
Polonia Bydgoszcz riders
Expatriate speedway riders in Poland
Swedish expatriates in Poland
Lakeside Hammers riders
Oxford Cheetahs riders
Poole Pirates riders
Reading Racers riders
Swindon Robins riders
People from Motala Municipality
Sportspeople from Östergötland County